Pulaski Township may refer to:

 Pulaski Township, Lonoke County, Arkansas, in Lonoke County, Arkansas
 Pulaski Township, Michigan
 Pulaski Township, Morrison County, Minnesota
 Pulaski Township, Walsh County, North Dakota
 Pulaski Township, Williams County, Ohio
 Pulaski Township, Beaver County, Pennsylvania
 Pulaski Township, Lawrence County, Pennsylvania

See also
 Commemoration of Casimir Pulaski

Township name disambiguation pages